The 1978 Alaska gubernatorial election took place on November 7, 1978, for the post of governor of Alaska. Republican incumbent Jay Hammond defeated four opponents: former Governor of Alaska and write-in candidate Wally Hickel, Alaska Senator and Democratic nominee Chancy Croft, former Commissioner of Natural Resources and Independent candidate Tom Kelly and Alaskan Independence Party nominee Don Wright. After losing to Hammond in the Republican primary, Hickel ran as a write-in candidate and was able to outperform Croft. Republican Tom Fink and Democrat Jay Kerttula also ran in the open primary.

As of 2022, this is the earliest gubernatorial election in Alaska in which at least one candidate, Chancy Croft, is still living. This is the first time an incumbent Republican governor was successfully re-elected for a second term, and this would not occur again until 2022.

Results

References

Gubernatorial
1978
Alaska
November 1978 events in the United States